Stefan Faldbakken (born 13 January 1972) is a Norwegian film director and screenwriter. His film Uro was screened in the Un Certain Regard section at the 2006 Cannes Film Festival.

Filmography
 Kosmonaut  (2001)
 Anolit (2002)
 Uro (2006)
 Varg Veum - Skriften på veggen (2010)

References

External links

1972 births
Living people
Norwegian film directors
Norwegian screenwriters